The Paris Public School, at Main and 1st Sts., North, in Paris, Idaho, is a historic school that is listed on the National Register of Historic Places.  It is a brick building.  It was designed by architect Richard C. Watkins in Prairie School style and was built in 1918.

It is significant partly for reflecting a local fad:  the school, the Hotel Paris, the Les and Hazel Shepherd Bungalow, and the LDS Stake Office Building (all also NRHP-listed in Paris), reflect the Prairie style, which is otherwise relatively rare in Idaho.  According to a 1980 study, the style's unusual popularity in Paris gives the city a sense of architectural unity. The same study called the Public School the best and most representative example of the Prairie School in the city.

It was listed on the National Register in 1982.

References 

School buildings on the National Register of Historic Places in Idaho
Prairie School architecture in Idaho
School buildings completed in 1918
Bear Lake County, Idaho
Schools in Idaho
National Register of Historic Places in Bear Lake County, Idaho
1918 establishments in Idaho